Winrock is an unincorporated community in Conway County, Arkansas, United States. It is the location of, or closest community to, multiple historic sites that are listed on the National Register of Historic Places.

See also
National Register of Historic Places listings in Conway County, Arkansas

Notes

Unincorporated communities in Conway County, Arkansas
Unincorporated communities in Arkansas